Gojra, the administrative capital of Gojra Tehsil, is the city of Toba Tek Singh District in the Punjab province of Pakistan. Founded in 1896 during the British colonial period, Gojra was the commercial centre of lands which had recently come under cultivation, and was known for its "mandi" (market) for cash crops. It is the 50th largest city of Pakistan by population according to the 2017 census.

History

Pre-Independence
Gojra city was established in 1896, when the colonisation of Faisalabad began. The railway line between Faisalabad and Gojra was laid in 1899. The town was given the status of notified area committee in 1904 and upgraded to a B-Class Municipality in 1925. In 1906, the population was 2,589. According to The Imperial Gazetteer of India,"The business done in this rising mart on the railway, which has sprung into existence in the last six years owing to the extension of the Chenab Canal to the surrounding country, bides fair to rival in importance that of Faisalabad itself".

In 1919, following the Rowlatt Act, hartals broke out throughout Punjab. Gojra was affected by serious protests and a member of the Church Mission Society had to be escorted out of the town by loyal residents.

Post-Independence
In August 1947, India and Pakistan achieved independence. Riots and local fighting followed the expeditious withdrawal of the British, resulting in an estimated one million civilians deaths, particularly in the western region of Punjab. Gojra, which was in the region of the Punjab Province that became West Pakistan, was populated by a number of Hindus and Sikhs who migrated to India, while Muslim refugees from India settled in the district.

After independence from Britain, in view of its increasing size, it was declared as a 2nd class Municipal Committee in 1960. Gojra was raised to the status of tehsil town and affiliated with the newly established district Toba Tek Singh on 1 July 1982. After the introduction of Devolution of Powers Plan, the Tehsil Municipal Administration Gojra came into being on 12 August 2001.

Places 
Notable places near Gojra include:

 Chak 95 JB Gill
 Chahal
 Chawinda
 Garden Town

Government and public services

Civic administration 

The city was raised to the status of Tehsil town and affiliated with the newly established district Toba Tek Singh on 1 July 1982. After the introduction of the Devolution of Powers Plan, the Tehsil Municipal Administration Gojra came into being on 12 August 2001. The Canal resthouse is the oldest building constructed during British government in 1898.

Culture

Festivals 

The Punjabi people celebrate cultural and religious festivals throughout the region, such as arts and craft, music, local events, and religious celebrations.

The city of Gojra customarily celebrates its independence day on 14 August by raising the Pakistan flag at every home and important Govt buildings. Bazaars are colourfully decorated for the celebration, government and private buildings are brightly lit, and there are similar flag–raising ceremonies that are typically held in the district and its tehsils.

The arrival of spring brings the annual "Rang-e-Bahar" festival during the month of March, where the Parks & Horticulture Authority of the Gojra Municipal Committee organise a flower show and exhibition at Civil Club, Gojra.

Being a Muslim majority city, religious observances include Ramadan(Ramzan) and Muharram. The festivals of Chaand Raat, Eid al-Fitr and Eid al-Adha are celebrated and are national holidays. The celebration of the Prophet Muhammad birthday is observed in the city which is often referred to as "Eid Milād-un-Nabī". There are darbar and shrines which attract devotees during the annual Urs. There are Christian churches in the city where Easter and Christmas services take place.

Attire 
Traditional attire in Gojra is Punjabi clothing such as the dhoti, kurta and pagri. Gojra men wear white shalwar kameez as do women but with a dupatta (scarf). Mostly women wear burqas that may or may not cover the face. Combinations of Pakistani and Western attire are worn by women, such as an embroidered kurta worn with jeans or trousers, and half sleeve or sleeveless shirts with Capri pants. Men have adopted some of the modern Western styles for both casual and formal business dress such as dress pants, trousers, T-shirts and jeans.

Food 
Gojra's cuisine is very much Punjabi cuisine, with influences from the times of the Mughal and Colonial empires. Key ingredients include rice or roti (flatbread) served with a vegetable or non-vegetable curry, a salad consisting of spiced tomatoes and onions, and yogurt. This is usually accompanied by South Asian sweets such as jaggery, gajar ka halwa, gulab jamun, and jalebi. Tandoori barbecue specialties consist of naan bread served with tandoori chicken, chicken tikka or lamb shishkebab served with a mint chutney.

Street foods are a key element to cuisine. Samosas (deep fried pastry filled with vegetables or meat) are topped with an onion salad and two types of chutney. Other street foods include dahi bhale (deep fried vadas in creamy yoghurt), gol gappay (fried round puri filled with vegetables and topped with tamarind chutney) and vegetable or chicken pakoras. Biryani and murgh pilao rice are a specialty in Gojra.

A typical breakfast in Gojra is halwa poori comprising a deep-fried flatbread served with a spicy chickpea curry and sweet orange-coloured halwa. It is customarily accompanied by a sweet or salty yoghurt-based drink called lassi. During winter, a common breakfast is roghni naan bread served with paya curry.

Specialty drinks vary depending on climate. During winter, hot drinks are available, such as rabri doodh, a creamy dessert drink commonly made with full-fat milk, almonds, pistachios and basil seeds, dhood patti (milky tea), and Kashmiri chai, a pink coloured milky tea containing almonds and pistachios. During summer, drinks such as sugarcane rusk, limo pani (iced lemon water), skanjvi (iced orange and black pepper) and lassi are common.

Education

Private institutes
The city has 344 state-run primary and higher secondary educational institutions.

Sports 
Gojra has produced more than a hundred international players for the Pakistan hockey team. In 2015, Gojra Hockey Club, a local club, won the Jat Tar Singh memorial Under-19 hockey tournament. This high-profile tournament was held in India, where Gojra city team competed again best of Indian U19 hockey teams and won the championship. The Gojra team won this title by defeating Amritsar Academy 4–2 at Ludhiana Hockey Stadium.

In cricket, Gojra's Ehsan Adil has represented the Faisalabad Wolves, Habib Bank Limited cricket team and Pakistan Under-19 cricket team. He was selected in Pakistan's Test Squad for tour to South Africa in February 2013.

Notable people  

 Ehsan Adil - cricketer
 Abdul Qadeer Alvi - Politician
 Tariq Imran - hockey player
 Muhammad Irfan - hockey player
 Muhammad Ishaq - Ex MNA
 Chaudhary Khalid Javed - Member National Assembly
 Mehak Malik - dancer and actress
 Muhammad Nadeem - hockey player
 Muhammad Qasim - hockey player
 Imran Shah - hockey player
 Tahir Zaman - hockey player

References 

Populated places in Toba Tek Singh District